The Dymphna Clark Memorial Lecture is presented in honour of Dymphna Clark, an Australian linguist and educator, and wife of historian Manning Clark.

The first Dymphna Clark Memorial Lecture was presented on 2 March 2002 at Manning Clark House in Canberra, Australia by Dymphna’s granddaughter, Anna Clark. The following year Dymphna's daughter, Katerina Clark gave the presentation. Held annually from its inception until 2014, it is now presented every two years.

List of lecturers

External links
 Official website

References

Lecture series
Awards established in 2002
2002 establishments in Australia
Culture of the Australian Capital Territory